James H. Woods was an American politician from New York.

He was an Anti-Masonic member of the New York State Assembly (Ontario Co.) in 1833.

Sources
The New York Civil List compiled by Franklin Benjamin Hough (pages 214 and 317; Weed, Parsons and Co., 1858)

Members of the New York State Assembly
People from Ontario County, New York
Anti-Masonic Party politicians from New York (state)
19th-century American politicians
Year of birth missing
Year of death missing